Syedna Abduttayyeb Zakiuddin Bin Syedna Ismail Badruddin (died on 4 Safar 1200 AH/1787 AD, Burhanpur, India) was the 41st Da'i al-Mutlaq (Absolute Missionary) of the Dawoodi Bohra sect of Ismaili Musta‘lī Islam. He succeeded the 40th Da'i Hebatullah-il-Moayed Fiddeen, to the religious post.

Family and early life
Syedna Abduttayyeb Zakiuddin was born in Wankaner. He was only three years of age when his father Syedna Ismail Badruddin II died. The 39th Dā'i Syedna Ibrahim Wajiuddin took him under his care. Syedna Wajiuddin gave his granddaughter Khadija AaiSaheba binte Syedna Hebatullah-il-Moayed Fiddeen in marriage to Syedna Abduttayyeb Zakiuddin. After Khadija AaSaheba died, Syedna Wajiuddin gave his granddaughter Ratan AaiSaheba binte Syedi Khan BhaiSaheb in marriage to Syedna Abduttayyeb Zakiuddin. By this marriage, Syedna Abduttayyeb Zakiuddin had four sons; the 42nd Dā'i Syedna Yusuf Najmuddin, Syedna Abde Ali Saifuddin, Syedi Sheikh Adam Safiyuddin and Syedi Abdul Qadir Hakimuddin.

Accession
Syedna Zakiuddin became Da'i al-Mutlaq in 1193AH/1780 AD. His period of Dawat was from 1193–1200 AH/1780–1787 AD.

His associates were: Mawazeen: Syedi Sheikh Adam Safiyuddin, Yusuf Najmuddin and Mukasir: Syedna Abdeali Saifuddin

Succession
He was succeeded by the 42nd Da'i, Syedna Yusuf Najmuddin Bin Syedna Zakiuddin.

Legacy 
He ordered building of a Haveli (a royal palace) in Burhanpur. The Haveli was built in the royal classical Rajasthani style with exquisite carvings, and engravings. The Haveli was built in 1197 AH. Syedna Zakiuddin visited Burhanpur in 1199 AH and resided in the Haveli and then adopted Burhanpur as the Capital of Dawat.

References

Further reading
Daftary, Farhad, The Ismaili, Their History and Doctrine (Chapter -Mustalian Ismailism- p. 300-310)
Lathan, Young, Religion, Learning and Science
Bacharach, Joseph W. Meri, Medieval Islamic Civilisation

Dawoodi Bohra da'is
1787 deaths
Year of birth unknown
18th-century Ismailis